Nebria desgodinsi is a species of ground beetle in the Nebriinae subfamily that can be found in Nepal and India.

References

desgodinsi
Beetles described in 1883
Beetles of Asia